Austin David "Buzzy" Cohen (born March 5, 1985) is a recording music industry executive and trivia enthusiast from Los Angeles, California, best known for his association with the game show Jeopardy!. Cohen was the winner of the 2017 Tournament of Champions and later appeared in the All-Star Games in 2019 and as a guest host for the show's 2021 Tournament of Champions following longtime host Alex Trebek's death.

Early life
Cohen grew up in Millburn, New Jersey. He graduated from the Pingry School in 2003, and received his BA from Columbia College of Columbia University in 2007.

Career

Jeopardy! appearances
Cohen won $164,603 over nine games in April and May 2016. Many of his victories were guaranteed victories, which allowed Cohen to wager nothing and use his final response to make sarcastic remarks toward Alex Trebek, a humorous style that earned Cohen both praise and disdain from Jeopardy! fans. He later returned for the 2017 Tournament of Champions, which he won, collecting the grand prize of $250,000.

Cohen appeared again in the 2019 Jeopardy! All-Star Games relay tournament. His team went home with $75,000 after losing the wild card match.

Following Trebek's death, Cohen hosted the May 2021 Jeopardy! Tournament of Champions, being the youngest Jeopardy! host at age 36.

Other appearances
Cohen joined the cast of the American version of The Chase in 2022, joining as a Chaser as a replacement for the departing Ken Jennings. His Chaser name is "The Stunner".

Personal life
Cohen has been married to Elisha Levin since 2011. They have two daughters.

Filmography

References

External links

1985 births
Living people
People from Los Angeles
People from Millburn, New Jersey
Columbia College (New York) alumni
American music industry executives
Jeopardy! contestants
American game show hosts
Jewish American entertainers
Jeopardy!